The 1975 Australian Open was a tennis tournament played on outdoor grass courts at the Kooyong Lawn Tennis Club in Melbourne in Australia and was held from 21 December 1974 to 1 January 1975.  It was the 63rd edition of the Australian Open and the first Grand Slam tournament of the year. The singles titles were won by Australians John Newcombe and Evonne Goolagong.

Seniors

Men's singles

 John Newcombe defeated  Jimmy Connors, 7–5, 3–6, 6–4, 7–6(9–7) 
• It was Newcombe's 7th and last career Grand Slam singles title and his 2nd title at the Australian Open.

Women's singles

 Evonne Goolagong defeated  Martina Navratilova, 6–3, 6–2 
• It was Goolagong Cawley's 4th career Grand Slam singles title and her 2nd title at the Australian Open.

Men's doubles

 John Alexander /  Philip Dent defeated  Bob Carmichael /  Allan Stone, 6–3, 7–6 
• It was Alexander's 1st career Grand Slam doubles title.
• It was Dent's 1st and only career Grand Slam doubles title.

Women's doubles

 Evonne Goolagong /  Peggy Michel defeated  Olga Morozova /  Margaret Court, 7–6, 7–6 
• It was Goolagong 4th career Grand Slam doubles title and her 3rd title at the Australian Open.
• It was Michel's 3rd and last career Grand Slam doubles title and her 2nd title at the Australian Open.

Mixed doubles
No competition between 1970 and 1986.

References

External links
Australian Open official website

 
 

 
 
December 1974 sports events in Australia
January 1975 sports events in Australia
1975,Australian Open